M. leonina may refer to:
 Macaca leonina, the northern pig-tailed macaque, a primate species
 Melibe leonina, the hooded nudibranch or the lion nudibranch, a predatory sea slug species
 Mirounga leonina, the southern elephant seal, an elephant seal species

See also
 Leonina (disambiguation)